Hartley is an unincorporated community in Gogebic County, in the U.S. state of Michigan.

History
Hartley was named for Charles H. Hartley, a railroad official.

References

Unincorporated communities in Gogebic County, Michigan